Cheoah may refer to:

Cheoah Dam, a hydroelectric complex on the Little Tennessee River in North Carolina
Cheoah River, tributary of the Little Tennessee River in North Carolina